This is a list consisting of all the heads of state of modern and contemporary Romania, from the establishment of the United Principalities in 1859 to the present-day in the early 21st century.

In addition, Iohannis is the first Romanian president to stem from an ethnic minority of the country, as he is a Transylvanian Saxon, therefore part of the broader German minority of Romania. His term will normally end in December 2024 and cannot be renewed.

United Principalities (1859–1881)

Kingdom of Romania (1881–1947)

Romanian People's Republic/Socialist Republic of Romania (1947–1989) 

Status

General Secretary of the Romanian Workers' Party/Romanian Communist Party

Contemporary Romania (1989–present) 

The Constitution of Romania prohibits the President to be a member of any political party while in office. The parties listed below represent the political affiliation before the 1991 Constitution was adopted and the party affiliation of the ad interim (i.e. acting) Presidents, for whom such a restriction is not explicitly stipulated in the law.

Status

Timeline

See also 

 Domnitor
 King of Romania
 President of Romania
 List of presidents of Romania
 List of presidents of Romania by time in office
 Prime Minister of Romania
 List of heads of government of Romania

Footnotes and references 

 Bulei, Ion, O istorie a românilor, Editura Meronia, București, 2007, pg. 266-267

External links 

 The President of Romania
 Romanian Royal Family

Romania

Heads of state

bg:Крал на Румъния
da:Rumæniens konger
et:Rumeenia riigipeade loend
es:Gobernantes de Rumania
fr:Liste des souverains de Roumanie
id:Daftar Raja Rumania
it:Re di Romania
la:Index regum praesidumque Romaniae
pl:Władcy Rumunii
pt:Anexo:Lista de reis da Romênia
sl:Seznam predsednikov Romunije
zh:罗马尼亚君主